The  was a revenge spree killing that occurred on the night of 21 May 1938 in the rural village of Kamo close to Tsuyama in Okayama, Empire of Japan.

, a 21-year-old man, killed 30 people, including his grandmother, with a Browning shotgun, katana, and axe, and seriously injured three others before killing himself with the shotgun. It is the deadliest shooting by a lone gunman in Japanese history.

Massacre
Mutsuo Toi cut the electricity line to the village of Kamo on the evening of 20 May, which left the community in darkness. At around 1:30 a.m. on 21 May, he killed his 76-year-old grandmother by decapitating her with an axe in her sleep. He killed 29 neighbors (27 of whom died at the scene of the incident, while two others were fatally wounded, dying of their injuries later) and seriously injured three others in about an hour and half. This was almost half of the residents of the small community. At dawn he committed suicide by shooting himself in the chest on a nearby mountain.

Mutsuo Toi 
 was born in Okayama Prefecture to well-off parents. His parents died of tuberculosis when he was a baby, so he and his sister were brought up by their grandmother. He was originally outgoing, but at the age of 17 he became socially withdrawn after his sister married in 1934.

He was interested in the story of Sada Abe, the prostitute who, in May 1936, strangled her lover then severed his genitals. He had started writing a novel, .

From his suicide notes it appears that after May 1937 when he was diagnosed as suffering from tuberculosis, the young women in the village rejected his sexual advances.

Location
The massacre was carried out in the small village of Kamocho Kurami, in the now city of Tsuyama. The village has since been merged with different towns and cities over the years due to depopulation. The village's population at the time of the massacre was 23 households and 111 people, but as of 2010 is 13 households and 37 people. After the massacre, some families moved away. Most of the residents in the village are now over 65 years old and have stated that no one has moved to Kurami since the massacre.

The house that Mutsuo Toi lived in was demolished in 2015, after sitting abandoned for years. The coordinates of this location are at the top of the page.

Suicide notes 
Toi left several long notes which revealed that he was concerned about the social impact of his tuberculosis, which in the 1930s was an incurable fatal illness. He felt that his female neighbors became cold towards him once they knew of his illness, and that he was despised as hypersexual, and he also stated in the notes that neighbors insulted and treated him badly after he was found to have tuberculosis.

For revenge, he decided to enter their homes and kill them. He waited for the time when the women returned to their houses. The authorities were concerned, and his gun license was revoked. He however prepared swords and guns secretly.

He regretted that he would not be able to shoot some people he wanted to, as that would have involved killing people he regarded as innocent. He also wrote that he killed his grandmother because he could not bear leaving her alive to face the shame and social stigma that would be associated with being a "murderer's grandmother".

Films
The 1983 Japanese film, Ushimitsu no mura (Village of Doom), was based on the massacre. It stars Masato Furuoya as Tsugio Inumaru, an emotionally distraught young man who goes on a violent killing spree after his tuberculosis keeps him from serving in World War II. Furuoya committed suicide by hanging on 25 March 2003, twenty years after the film's release.
 Fukushûki, 1969 (Vengeance Demon) (復讐鬼)
 The 8-Tomb Village, 1951
 The 8-Tomb Village, 1977
 The 8-Tomb Village, 1996

See also 

 List of massacres in Japan
 List of rampage killers

References

Notes

Bibliography 
 
 

Mass murder in 1938
Massacres in 1938
Murder–suicides in Japan
Massacres in Japan
Spree shootings in Japan
Deaths by firearm in Japan
Suicides by firearm in Japan
Axe murder
May 1938 events
1938 murders in Japan
Mass shootings in Japan